Bobbau is a village and a former municipality in the district of Anhalt-Bitterfeld, in Saxony-Anhalt, Germany. Since September 1, 2009, it has been part of the town Bitterfeld-Wolfen.

Former municipalities in Saxony-Anhalt
Anhalt-Bitterfeld
Duchy of Anhalt